The 2004 Cameroonian Premier League season in Cameroon was contested by 18 teams. This association football competition was won by Cotonsport Garoua.

Group stage

Group A

Group B

Playoff

Championship Group

Relegation Group

References

Cameroon - List of final tables (RSSSF)

Cam
Cam
1
Elite One seasons